This is a list of characters from the Puppet Master series of films.

André Toulon
André Toulon is the main protagonist of the Puppet Master series. Toulon appeared as a hero in Puppet Master III: Toulon's Revenge, and a victim in the beginning of the first film. After dying, Toulon was resurrected first as a villain in His Unholy Creation only and then as just another fighter inside a puppet-body. He is referenced throughout the movies, and is the greatest connection, besides the puppets themselves, the films have with each other. In Curse of the Puppet Master his name was only on a sign. In Puppet Master, parts of the legend of Toulon is that he committed suicide in 1939. But in Puppet Master 3 takes place in 1941, and he is still very much alive. (possibly a mistake) Toulon is played by William Hickey in Puppet Master, by Steve Welles in Puppet Master II, by  Guy Rolfe in Puppet Master III: Toulon's Revenge, Puppet Master 4 and Puppet Master 5: The Final Chapter.  Rolfe and Greg Sestero played the character at different ages in the prequel Retro Puppet Master.

Blade
The Leader of the puppets is one of the few puppets, along with Pinhead, to appear in all of the Puppet Master movies to date. He is the only puppet to have appeared on all of the VHS, DVD and Blu-ray covers of the Puppet master Movies. He is 1'9", weighs 4 lbs, and bears a gothic-styled appearance. He has a gaunt pale face with seemingly empty black eye sockets and long white hair and wears a black trench coat and wide-brimmed hat. It is revealed (in Puppet Master III: Toulon's Revenge) that Blade was created by André Toulon and modeled after Gestapo Major (Sturmbannführer) Krauss. He has the soul of Dr. Hess, a German scientist and medical doctor who wanted to work with Toulon. He was used for evil under puppet masters Neil Gallagher, André Toulon (in Puppet Master II) and Dr. Magrew, all three of whom he later turned against. He was used for good under André Toulon, Danny Coogan, Rick Meyers, Peter Hertz A.K.A. Eric Weiss, and Robert Toulon whom he each served loyally. Blade has a sharp hook for his left hand and a knife for his right hand. He sometimes has spike-shaped "bullet eyes" that pop out of his sockets from time to time.

Appears in all the Puppet Master films.

Pinhead
Pinhead is 1'7" and weighs 2 lbs. Before he became a puppet, Pinhead was a man named Herman Strauss. Strauss was a truck driver who secretly brought food to the Jewish ghettos; as a result, he was killed by the Nazis for treason. His retro version was the soul of a beggar André Toulon knew. The Retro version was the first puppet Toulon (with the help of Afzel) brought to life (Retro Puppet Master). Pinhead was used for evil under puppet masters Neil Gallagher, André Toulon (Puppet Master II), and Dr. Magrew, all whom he turned against in the end. Pinhead's only power is his two big hands, which can deliver quite a punch. He is unnaturally strong, able to move or drag a full grown human body with ease. Pinhead got his name from the fact that his head is tinier that the rest of his body.

Appears in all the Puppet Master films.

Leech Woman
Ms. She began as a young Swiss girl named Ilsa. Ilsa's father was an unloving Swiss ambassador. One night in 1902, while she and her father were in Paris, Ilsa traveled to the Theater Magic where she met her future husband André Toulon. Later, she is kidnapped by the slaves of the demon lord, Sutekh, and is rescued by André and his first six puppets (Retro Puppet Master). Later in 1926, Ilsa (now named Elsa) and André go to Cairo, where André's (presumed 7th) living puppet, Mephisto, is burned to a crisp. An old merchant gives Toulon a new type of magic which Ilsa convinces André to learn from the merchant. In Berlin, Ilsa and André have four new puppets, Tunneler, Jester, Pinhead and Six-Shooter. Tunneler, Pinhead and Jester are based on their friends: Joseph Sebastion (Tunneler), an American Soldier who was captured and forced to work in the salt mines by the Nazis; Jester, a book-keeper named Hans Seiderman who the Toulons liked for his love of jokes and who was shot to death by the Nazis; and Pinhead, a kindhearted man called Herman Strauss who was killed for smuggling food into a work camp (Six-Shooter's identity was never revealed). Ilsa was murdered by Major Krauss when she tried to stop the Nazis from kidnapping André and the Puppets. André later went to a morgue with Pinhead and Jester, where they took the tissue from Ilsa's corpse. Back at their temporary camp, Andre injects the formula that he made from the tissue into the puppet of Ilsa he made for her, resurrecting her as a puppet. Toulon also fed a leech to the puppet, giving her its power. In Puppet Master II, André's zombie form has Blade, Leech Woman, and Torch go to gather material for a new batch of fluid. Leech Woman is captured by an overweight woman, named Martha, and thrown into her fireplace after she killed her husband. Torch then set fire to the woman, killing her, to avenge Leech Woman. Charles Band, however, mentioned that Leech Woman was saved and revived, but was not present in Puppet Master 4 or Puppet Master 5. Leech Woman's power is her ability to vomit poisonous leeches. In addition to her leeches, she wields a small knife. She is also the only female puppet before Bombshell and Comb Queen.

Appears in:

Puppet MasterPuppet Master IIPuppet Master III: Toulon's RevengeCurse of the Puppet MasterRetro Puppet MasterPuppet Master: The Legacy (cameo appearance)Puppet Master: Axis of evilPuppet Master X: Axis RisingPuppet Master: Axis Termination

Jester
Jester’s a vintage typical court harlequinade. He's 1'8" and weighs one and a half pounds. In Puppet Master III: Toulon's Revenge it is revealed that before he became a puppet, Jester was a man named Hans Seiderman; a bookkeeper who loved to play pranks and tell jokes who was killed by the Nazis when his jokes went too far. He was used for evil under puppet masters Neil Gallagher, André Toulon (Puppet Master II), and Dr. Magrew, all whom he turned against in the end. Jester has the ability to rotate three portions of his face: his forehead, middle face, and chin. He can show five expressions: happy, devious, sad, angry or surprised, which also doubles as scared. He holds a scepter which can sometimes be used as a weapon. However, Jester is only seen with his scepter in Puppet Master vs Demonic Toys. Out of all the puppets, Jester has the most designs. In Puppet Master 1-5, Jester has red clothes, his sleeves are mixed in purple and black, in Part 1 and the beginning of Part 2 he doesn't wear a hat, except in a scene where he is behind a curtain, while every movie since he has worn a jester hat, the rest of Part 2, and 3-5, he had a purple hat. In Puppet Master 6-8, Jester is all red, mixed on his sleeves are red and blue, and he has a blue hat. In Puppet Master vs. Demonic Toys, Jester is all orange. He was given a mace-arm by Robert Toulon after a terrible fire in Puppet Master vs. Demonic Toys. In Puppet Master, the puppets turned on their master because he threw Jester, and in part II, the puppets tried to find the formula for the starving puppet. In Puppet Master 1–5, Jester Serves as the watchman of the group; looking out for danger and keeping the enemy occupied long enough for the puppets to strike. Jester's most common companion is Pinhead in films III-V, and Blade in Curse of the Puppet Master and Puppet Master vs. Demonic Toys. Jester also spends time with Leech Woman. He is cared for by the other puppets. Jester can fit through small places where the other puppets can't. He is also sometimes credited as the leader of the puppets, but he lets Blade act as leader.

Appears in all the Puppet Master films except Puppet Master: The Littlest Reich and Blade: The Iron Cross.

Trivia:
 Jester had never directly killed anyone on screen until he killed Sheriff Garvey along with a help of Blade in Curse of the Puppet Master.
 Jester is originally the Leader of the Toulon Puppet Army, before Blade and Decapitron.

Tunneler
According to a trading card released by Fullmoon features, Tunneler's soul is Joseph Sebastein, a soldier who was forced to work in the Nazis' salt mines until he died. Tunneler's namesake and main weapon is a cone-shaped power drill replacing his scalp; he usually kills his victims by charging them head-on with his drill running.

Appears in all the Puppet Master films except Puppet Master vs. Demonic Toys.

Trivia:
 His retro counterpart "Drill Sargeant" was André's fellow puppeteer, Vigo Garrison.
 In the action figure, he has a machine gun and a pick axe, but he never used them in the movies.

Torch
Torch was built in Puppet Master II by André Toulon. Torch later betrayed Toulon and set him on fire. Afterwards, he assisted Camille in "visiting" mentally ill children. He appeared in Puppet Master 5: The Final Chapter assisting Rick Meyers to defeat a demon. His fate and who he was in real life are currently unknown. Torch has a flamethrower for his right hand that is used to burn people alive. In Puppet Master: Axis of Evil Torch's picture is seen as the credits roll. In the comics, it turns out that Torch used to be Toulon's own son. Who had betrayed his father, had joined the Hitler Youth, and was also given a flame thrower

Appears in:

Puppet Master IIPuppet Master 4 (Poster Appearance)Puppet Master 5: The Final ChapterCurse of the Puppet Master (Cameo Appearance)Puppet Master: The Legacy (Cameo Appearance)Puppet Master: The Littlest Reich (As Kaiser)

Six–Shooter
Six-Shooter is a cowboy with six arms, each holding a gun. Other than his guns, he has a red bandanna that moves by itself. He is first shown in Puppet Master III: Toulon's Revenge. His skills include sharpshooting, roping and climbing walls like a spider. In Retro Puppet Master, it is revealed that in real life, the retro version of Six-Shooter was once the person who first taught Andre how to animate inanimate objects; the identity of the later Six Shooter hasn't been revealed. In the behind the scenes of Retro Puppet Master, Six Shooter is seen as Guy Rolfe opens the puppet trunk. In Puppet Master vs. Demonic Toys, Six-Shooter is given laser-shooters in replacement for his guns as a result of a fire that had happened previously. In Puppet Master: Axis of Evil, Six shooter's arms makes a cameo in the movie, and his picture is seen also in the movie along with Torch as the credits roll. In Puppet Master X: Axis Rising Six-Shooter is revealed through images for the film that he will wear a black stealth outfit, at this time it is currently unknown why.

Appears in:

Puppet Master III: Toulon's RevengePuppet Master 4Puppet Master 5Curse of the Puppet MasterRetro Puppet Master (Behind The Scenes)Puppet Master: The LegacyPuppet Master vs. Demonic ToysPuppet Master: Axis of evil (Arms Only)Puppet Master X: Axis Rising Puppet Master: Axis Termination

Decapitron
Decapitron is one of the puppets featured near the end of both Puppet Master 4 and 5. Its appearance is modeled after André Toulon's outfit from Puppet Master III: Toulon's Revenge. It wears a brown jacket with a black undershirt, a black belt, and black gloves. Its regular head has indented eyes and nose, and the base of its head seems to resemble the base of a light bulb. Its name seems to reflect the fact he has interchangeable heads, when taking them off would make him decapitate himself. Not much is known about Decapitron's background, other than the fact he was an unfinished puppet André Toulon worked on while he was alive. Decapitron's height and weight are also not revealed in the films as well. Decapitron has the soul of André Toulon, the namesake and creator of the puppets in the "Puppet Master" franchise. Unlike the other puppet creations of André Toulon's, Decapitron cannot be activated by having the formula injected directly through a needle. Rather, it has to be activated by the formula combined with an electric current.

Appears in:

Puppet Master 4Puppet Master 5: The Final ChapterPuppet Master: The Legacy (cameo appearance)

Inanimate Puppets
 Adolf Hitler Puppet 
 Clippo the Clown 
 Faust and his wife 
 Little Red Riding Hood
 Mr. Punch (Cameo)
 Gengie (Indian Puppet)
 Dummy
 Pulse Pounders Puppet
 Sailor Puppet
 Teto the Clown
 Freuhoffer's Other Puppets

Other Puppets
 Kahn
 Tank
 Mephisto
 Gypsy
 Matt
 Ninja
 Djinn the Homunculus
 Comb Queen
 Happy Amphibian
 Drac (Action Lab Comics Only)
 The Mortician (Action Figure Only)
 Unnamed female skeletal puppet (Possessing the soul of Madam Adon)
 Pajama Boy (Action Lab Comics Only)

Nazi Puppets
 Blitzkrieg
 Bombshell
 Weremacht
 Kamikaze

Retro–Puppets
 Cyclops
 Dr. Death
 Retro-Blade
 Retro-Pinhead
 Drill Sargeant (Originally known as Retro-Tunneler)
 Retro-6-Shooter

Human Characters

Introduced in Puppet Master
 André Toulon
 Alex Whitaker
 Dana Hadley
 Carissa Stamford
 Frank Forrester
 Neil Gallagher 
 Megan Gallagher
 Theresa

Introduced in Puppet Master II
 Carolyn Bramwell - The leader of the parapsychologist group sent to investigate Megan Gallagher's death
 Patrick Bramwell - Carolyn's brother and fellow investigator, killed early on in the film by Tunneler
 Camille Kenney 
 Michael Kenney 
 Wanda
 Lance
 Martha
 Mathew
 Elsa Toulon

Introduced in later films
 Rick Myers
 Cameron Phillips
 Dr. Magrew
 Jane Magrew
 Robert Winsley
 Billy
 Dr. Hess
 Robert K. Toulon
 Alexandra Toulon
 Peter Hertz / Eric Weiss
 Suzie
 Lauren
 Dr. Carl Baker
 Dr. Leslie Piper
 Tom Hendy
 Jason
 Scott
 Art Cooney
 Afzel
 Sergeant Jessica Russell
 Julian
 Christina
 Claudia
 Danny Coogan
 Beth
 Uncle Len
 Don Coogan
 Elma Coogan
 Duval
 Valentin
 Latour
 Vigo
Captain Brooks
Georgina Vale
Sturmbahnfurher Krabke
Doktor Gerde Ernst
Dr. Ivan (character from Decadent Evil, Decadent Evil II and Ravenwolf Towers)
Elisa Ivanov (daughter of Dr. Ivan)
Oberhelfer Friede Steitze
Antoinette Longpre
General Kip Hansard

Villainous characters
 Sutekh
 Mummy Servants
 Totems
 Neil Gallagher
 Joey Carp
 Major Krauss
 Lieutenant Stein
 General Mueller
 Dr. Lawrence Jennings
 Sheriff Garvey
 Deputy Wayburn
 Maclain
 Erica Sharpe
 Ozu
 Max
 Klaus
 Zombie André Toulon

Fictional puppets

Lists of horror film characters by franchise
Lists of science fiction characters